Ioannis Evaggelopoulos (Greek: Ιωάννης Ευαγγελόπουλος) was a Greek chieftain of the Macedonian Struggle from Mikropoli, Drama.

Biography 
Ioannis Evaggelopoulos was born in the end of the 19th century in Mikropoli. He cooperated with various Greek armed bands as a rifleman in the areas of Drama, Elassona, Pieria and Giannitsa, during the Macedonian Struggle. He was then put in charge of a guerilla force which fought against the Ottomans and Bulgarians in Olympus and in the area of Giannitsa.

References 

History of Drama, Greece
Greek people of the Macedonian Struggle

People from Drama (regional unit)